The 6th constituency of the Loire (French: Sixième circonscription de la Loire) is a French legislative constituency in the Loire département. Like the other 576 French constituencies, it elects one MP using a two round electoral system.

Description

The 6th constituency of the Loire covers the central parts of the department to the north of Saint-Etienne

Long serving conservative deputy Pascal Clément stepped down at the 2012 election, his successor, Paul Salen was defeated in 2017 in the second round run off by Julien Borowczyk of En Marche!.

Assembly Members

Election results

2022

 
 
|-
| colspan="8" bgcolor="#E9E9E9"|
|-

2017

2012

References

6